Krout Glacier is a tributary glacier,  long, draining the north slopes of the Prince Olav Mountains, Antarctica, between Mount Sellery and Mount Smithson and entering Gough Glacier just east of Mount Dodge. It was named by the Advisory Committee on Antarctic Names for Equipment Operator Walter L. Krout, U.S. Navy, of Operation Deep Freeze, 1964.

References

Glaciers of Dufek Coast